Volgograd is a city in Russia.

Volgograd may also refer to:
Volgograd Oblast, a federal subject of Russia
Volgograd International Airport, an airport in Volgograd Oblast, Russia
Volgograd Reservoir, a fresh water reservoir in Volgograd and Saratov Oblasts, Russia
FC Volgograd, an association football club based in Volgograd, Russia